Greta Guižauskaitė (born 31 January 1997) is a Lithuanian footballer who plays as a defender for FK Vilnius. She is also a futsal player, and represented Lithuania internationally in both football and futsal.

Club career
Guižauskaitė has played for MFA Žalgiris, Vilniaus FM - Amber, Vilniaus regiono jungtinė komanda, Vilnaius FK JL Stars' women's futsal team and FK Utenos Utenis in Lithuania.

International career
Guižauskaitė has been capped for Lithuania at senior level in both football and futsal. In football, she represented Lithuania at two UEFA Women's Under-17 Championship qualifications (2013 and 2014), two UEFA Women's Under-19 Championship qualifications (2015 and 2016) and the UEFA Women's Euro 2022 qualifying. She made her senior debut on 29 August 2015 during the Baltic Cup against Latvia.

In futsal, Guižauskaitė played for Lithuania at the UEFA Women's Futsal Euro 2019 (preliminary round).

References

1997 births
Living people
Lithuanian women's footballers
Women's association football defenders
Lithuania women's international footballers
Lithuanian women's futsal players